Emrys Hughes (birth unknown – death unknown) was a Welsh professional rugby league footballer who played in the 1930s.

Playing career

International honours
Emrys Hughes won caps for Wales while at Huddersfield in 1938 against England, and in 1939 against France.

County Cup Final appearances
Emrys Hughes left-, i.e. number 11, in Huddersfield's 18–10 victory over Hull F.C. in the 1938 Yorkshire County Cup Final during the 1938–39 season at Odsal Stadium, Bradford on Saturday 22 October 1938.

References

External links
Profile at saints.org.uk

Huddersfield Giants players
Llanelli RFC players
Place of birth missing
Rugby league players from Port Talbot
Rugby league props
Rugby league second-rows
Wales national rugby league team players
Welsh rugby league players
Welsh rugby union players
Year of birth missing
Place of death missing
Year of death missing